Artemisia is a large, diverse genus of plants with between 200 and 400 species belonging to the daisy family Asteraceae. Common names for various species in the genus include mugwort, wormwood, and sagebrush.

Artemisia comprises hardy herbaceous plants and shrubs, which are known for the powerful chemical constituents in their essential oils. Artemisia species grow in temperate climates of both hemispheres, usually in dry or semiarid habitats. Notable species include A. vulgaris (common mugwort), A. tridentata (big sagebrush), A. annua (sagewort), A. absinthium (wormwood), A. dracunculus (tarragon), and A. abrotanum (southernwood). The leaves of many species are covered with white hairs.

Most species have strong aromas and bitter tastes from terpenoids and sesquiterpene lactones, which discourage herbivory, and may have had a selective advantage. The small flowers are wind-pollinated. Artemisia species are used as food plants by the larvae of a number of Lepidoptera species.

Some botanists split the genus into several genera, but DNA analysis does not support the maintenance of the genera Crossostephium, Filifolium, Neopallasia, Seriphidium, and Sphaeromeria; three other segregate genera — Stilnolepis, Elachanthemum, and Kaschgaria — are maintained by this evidence. Occasionally, some of the species are called sages, causing confusion with the Salvia sages in the family Lamiaceae.

Taxonomy
The genus was erected by Carl Linnaeus in 1753. The name Artemisia derives from the Greek goddess Artemis (Roman Diana), the namesake of Greek Queens Artemisia I and II. A more specific reference may be to Artemisia II of Caria, a botanist and medical researcher (also a queen and naval commander), who died in 350 BC.

Selected species
, Plants of the World Online accepted almost 470 species, including:

Artemisia abrotanum L. – southernwood, southern wormwood, slovenwood, abrotanum, old-man, lad's love
Artemisia absinthium L. – grand wormwood, absinthium
Artemisia adamsii Besser
Artemisia afra Jacq. ex Willd. – African wormwood, African sagebrush
Artemisia alaskana Rydb. – Alaska wormwood; synonym of Artemisia kruhsiana subsp. alaskana
Artemisia alba Turra – camphor southernwood
Artemisia aleutica Hultén – Aleutian wormwood
Artemisia amoena Poljakov
Artemisia annua L. – annual wormwood, sweet sagewort, sweet Annie
Artemisia araxina Takht.
Artemisia arborescens L. – tree wormwood
Artemisia arbuscula Nutt. – little sagebrush, low Sagebrush, black sage
Artemisia arctisibirica Korobkov
Artemisia arenaria DC.
Artemisia arenicola Krasch. ex Poljakov
Artemisia argentea L'Hér. – Madeira wormwood
Artemisia argyi H.Lév. & Vaniot – Chinese mugwort
Artemisia argyrophylla Ledeb.
Artemisia armeniaca Lam.
Artemisia australis Less. – Āhinahina, Oahu wormwood
Artemisia austriaca Jacq.
Artemisia avarica Minat.
Artemisia balchanorum Krasch.
Artemisia baldshuanica Krasch. & Zaprjag.
Artemisia bargusinensis Spreng.
Artemisia bejdemaniae Leonova
Artemisia bhutanica Grierson & Spring.
Artemisia biennis Willd. – biennial sagewort, biennial wormwood
Artemisia bigelovii A.Gray – Bigelow sage, Bigelow sagebrush
Artemisia borealis Pall.
Artemisia borotalensis Poljakov
Artemisia caerulescens L.
Artemisia caespitosa Ledeb.
Artemisia californica Less. – coastal sagebrush, California sagebrush
Artemisia campestris L. – field wormwood, sand wormwood
Artemisia cana Pursh – silver sagebrush
Artemisia capillaris Thunb. – capillary wormwood, yin-chen wormwood
Artemisia carruthii Wood ex Carruth. – Carruth sagewort, Carruth's sagebrush
Artemisia chamaemelifolia Vill.
Artemisia cina O.Berg & C.F.Schmidt – santonica, Levant wormseed
Artemisia ciniformis Krasch. & Popov ex Poljakov
Artemisia compacta Fisch. ex DC.
Artemisia cuspidata Krasch.
Artemisia czukavinae Filatova
Artemisia daghestanica Krasch. & Poretzky
Artemisia demissa Krasch.
Artemisia deserti Krasch.
Artemisia desertorum Spreng.
Artemisia diffusa Krasch. ex Poljakov
Artemisia dimoana Popov
Artemisia dolosa Krasch.
Artemisia douglasiana Bess. – Douglas' mugwort, Douglas' sagewort, northwest mugwort
Artemisia dracunculus L. – tarragon, silky wormwood
Artemisia dubia Wall.
Artemisia dubjanskyana Krasch. ex Poljakov
Artemisia dumosa Poljakov
Artemisia elongata Filatova & Ladygina
Artemisia eremophila Krasch. & Butkov ex Poljakov
Artemisia fedtschenkoana Krasch.
Artemisia ferganensis Krasch. ex Poljakov
Artemisia filifolia Torr. – sand sagebrush, sand-sage, silvery wormwood
Artemisia franserioides Greene – ragweed sagebrush
Artemisia freyniana (Pamp.) Krasch.
Artemisia frigida Willd. – fringed sagebrush, fringed-sage, prairie sagewort, estafiata
Artemisia fulvella Filatova & Ladygina
Artemisia furcata Bieb. – forked wormwood
Artemisia galinae Ikonn.
Artemisia genipi Weber ex Stechm.
Artemisia glacialis L. – glacier wormwood, alpine mugwort
Artemisia glanduligera Krasch. ex Poljakov
Artemisia glauca Pall. ex Willd.
Artemisia glaucina Krasch. ex Poljakov
Artemisia globosa Krasch.
Artemisia globularia Cham. ex Bess. – purple wormwood
Artemisia glomerata Ledeb. – cudweed sagewort, Pacific alpine wormwood
Artemisia gmelinii Webb ex Stechmann – Gmelin's wormwood, Russian wormwood
Artemisia gorgonum Webb
Artemisia gracilescens Krasch. & Iljin
Artemisia granatensis Boiss. ex DC.
Artemisia gurganica (Krasch.) Filatova
Artemisia gypsacea Krasch., Popov & Lincz. ex Poljakov
Artemisia halodendron Turcz. ex Besser
Artemisia heptapotamica Poljakov
Artemisia herba-alba Asso – white wormwood
Artemisia hippolyti Butkov
Artemisia hololeuca M.Bieb. ex Besser
Artemisia incana (L.) Druce
Artemisia indica Willd. – yomogi
Artemisia insularis Kitam.
Artemisia integrifolia L.
Artemisia issykkulensis Poljakov
Artemisia jacutica Drobow
Artemisia japonica Thunb. – otoko yomogi
Artemisia judaica L.
Artemisia juncea Kar. & Kir.
Artemisia karatavica Krasch. & Abolin ex Poljakov
Artemisia karavajevii Leonova
Artemisia kaschgarica Krasch.
Artemisia kauaiensis (Skottsberg) Skottsberg – Āhinahina, Kauai wormwood
Artemisia keiskeana Miq.
Artemisia knorringiana Krasch.
Artemisia kochiiformis Krasch. & Lincz. ex Poljakov
Artemisia koidzumii Nakai
Artemisia kopetdaghensis Krasch. ex Poljakov
Artemisia korovinii Poljakov
Artemisia korshinskyi Krasch. ex Poljakov
Artemisia kuschakewiczii C.G.A.Winkl.
Artemisia laciniata Willd. – Siberian wormwood
Artemisia lactiflora Wall. ex DC. – white mugwort
Artemisia lagocephala (Besser) DC.
Artemisia lagopus Fisch. ex Besser
Artemisia latifolia Ledeb.
Artemisia ledebouriana Besser
Artemisia lehmanniana Bunge
Artemisia lessingiana Besser
Artemisia leucodes Schrenk
Artemisia leucophylla (Turcz. ex Besser) Pamp.
Artemisia leucotricha Krasch. ex Ladygina
Artemisia lipskyi Poljakov
Artemisia littoricola Kitam.
Artemisia longifolia Nutt. – longleaf sagebrush, longleaf wormwood
Artemisia ludoviciana Nutt. – gray sagewort, prairie sage, white sagebrush, Louisiana-sage, western-sage
Artemisia macilenta (Maxim.) Krasch.
Artemisia macrantha Ledeb.
Artemisia macrocephala Jacq. ex Besser
Artemisia macrorhiza Turcz.
Artemisia maritima L. – sea wormwood, absinthe de mer
Artemisia marschalliana Spreng.
Artemisia mauiensis (A.Gray) Skottsberg – Āhinahina, Maui wormwood
Artemisia maximovicziana Krasch. ex Poljakov
Artemisia medioxima Krasch. ex Poljakov
Artemisia michauxiana Bess. – Michaux sagebrush, Michaux's wormwood, lemon sagewort
Artemisia minor Jacq. ex Besser
Artemisia mogoltavica Poljakov
Artemisia mongolica (Besser) Fisch. ex Nakai
Artemisia mongolorum Krasch.
Artemisia montana (Nakai) Pamp.
Artemisia mucronulata Poljakov
Artemisia nakaii Pamp.
Artemisia namanganica Poljakov
Artemisia negrei Ouyahya
Artemisia nesiotica Raven – island sagebrush
Artemisia nigricans Filatova & Ladygina
Artemisia niitakayamensis Hayata
Artemisia nilagirica (C.B.Clarke) Pamp.
Artemisia nitida Bertol.
Artemisia nortonii Pamp.
Artemisia norvegica Fr. – Norwegian mugwort, alpine sagewort
Artemisia nova A.Nels. – black sagebrush, small sagebrush
Artemisia obtusiloba Ledeb.
Artemisia occidentalisichuanensis Y.R.Ling & S.Y.Zhao
Artemisia occidentalisinensis Y.R.Ling
Artemisia oelandica (Besser) Krasch.
Artemisia olchonensis Leonova
Artemisia oliveriana J.Gay ex Besser
Artemisia ordosica Krasch.
Artemisia orientalixizangensis Y.R.Ling & Humphries
Artemisia orientaliyunnanensis Y.R.Ling
Artemisia packardiae J.Grimes & Ertter – Packard's wormwood, Succor Creek sagebrush
Artemisia palmeri A.Gray – San Diego sagewort
Artemisia palustris L.
Artemisia pallens Wall
Artemisia pannosa Krasch.
Artemisia papposa S.F.Blake & Cronq. – Owyhee sage, Owyhee sagebrush
Artemisia pattersonii A.Gray – Patterson's wormwood
Artemisia pedatifida Nutt. – birdfoot sagebrush, matted sagewort
Artemisia pedemontana Balb.
Artemisia persica Boiss.
Artemisia phaeolepis Krasch.
Artemisia pontica L. – Roman wormwood, green-ginger
Artemisia porrecta Krasch. ex Poljakov
Artemisia porteri Cronq. – Porter's wormwood, Porter mugwort
Artemisia princeps Pamp. – Japanese mugwort, yomogi
Artemisia prolixa Krasch. ex Poljak.
Artemisia punctigera Krasch. ex Poljakov
Artemisia pycnocephala (Less.) DC. – beach wormwood, coastal sagewort
Artemisia pygmaea A.Gray – pygmy sagebrush
Artemisia quinqueloba Trautv.
Artemisia remotiloba Krasch. ex Poljakov
Artemisia rhodantha Rupr.
Artemisia rigida (Nutt.) A.Gray – scabland sagebrush
Artemisia rothrockii A.Gray – timberline sagebrush
Artemisia roxburghiana Wall. ex Besser
Artemisia rubripes Nakai
Artemisia rupestris L. – rock wormwood
Artemisia rutifolia Stephan ex Spreng.
Artemisia saissanica (Krasch.) Filatova
Artemisia saitoana Kitam.
Artemisia salsoloides Willd.
Artemisia samoiedorum Pamp.
Artemisia saposhnikovii Krasch. ex Poljak.
Artemisia schmidtiana Maxim. – angel's hair
Artemisia schrenkiana Ledeb.
Artemisia scoparia Waldst. & Kit. – redstem wormwood, yin-chen wormwood
Artemisia scopiformis Ledeb.
Artemisia scopulorum A.Gray – alpine sagebrush, dwarf sagebrush
Artemisia scotina Nevski
Artemisia semiarida (Krasch. & Lavrenko) Filatova
Artemisia senjavinensis Bess. – arctic wormwood
Artemisia sericea Weber ex Stechm.
Artemisia serrata Nutt. – sawtooth wormwood
Artemisia sieberi Besser
Artemisia sieversiana Willd. – sieversian wormwood
Artemisia spiciformis K.Koch
Artemisia spicigera K.Koch
Artemisia spinescens D.C.Eaton – budsage [syn. Picrothamnus desertorum]
Artemisia splendens Willd.
Artemisia stelleriana Bess. – hoary mugwort, oldwoman, Dusty Miller, beach wormwood
Artemisia stenocephala Krasch. ex Poljak.
Artemisia subarctica Krasch.
Artemisia subchrysolepis Filatova
Artemisia sublessingiana Krasch. ex Poljakov
Artemisia subsalsa Filatova
Artemisia succulenta Ledeb.
Artemisia suksdorfii Piper – coastal wormwood, Suksdorf sagewort
Artemisia sylvatica Maxim.
Artemisia tanacetifolia L.
Artemisia taurica Willd. – Tauric wormwood
Artemisia tenuisecta Nevski
Artemisia terrae-albae Krasch.
Artemisia thuscula Cav.
Artemisia tianschanica Krasch. ex Poljak.
Artemisia tilesii Ledeb. – Tilesius' wormwood, Aleutian mugwort
Artemisia tomentella Trautv.
Artemisia transbaicalensis Leonova
Artemisia transiliensis Poljakov
Artemisia trautvetteriana Besser
Artemisia tridentata Nutt. – big sagebrush, blue sage, black sage, basin sagebrush, common sagebrush
Artemisia tripartita Rydb. – threetip sagebrush
Artemisia turanica Krasch.
Artemisia turcomanica Gand.
Artemisia umbelliformis Lam. – Alps wormwood, alpine wormwood
Artemisia vachanica Krasch. ex Poljak.
Artemisia valida Krasch. ex Poljak.
Artemisia verlotiorum Lamotte – Chinese wormwood
Artemisia vulgaris L. – mugwort, felonherb, green-ginger, common wormwood
Artemisia waltonii J.R.Drumm. ex Pamp.
Artemisia wudanica Liou & W.Wang
Artemisia xerophytica Krasch.
Artemisia yadongensis Ling & Y.R.Ling
Artemisia yongii Y.R.Ling
Artemisia younghusbandii J.R.Drumm. ex Pamp.
Artemisia zayuensis Y.R.Ling
Artemisia zhongdianensis Y.R.Ling

Formerly placed here 

Centipeda minima (L.) A.Braun & Asch. (as A. minima L.)
Eupatorium capillifolium (Lam.) Small (as A. capillifolia Lam.)
Filifolium sibiricum (L.) Kitam. (as A. sibirica (L.) Maxim.)
Grangea maderaspatana (L.) Poir. (as A. maderaspatana L.)
Matricaria discoidea DC. (as A. matricarioides auct.)

Classification 
Classification of Artemisia is difficult. Divisions of Artemisia prior to 2000 into subgenera or sections have not been backed up by molecular data, but much of the molecular data, as of 2006, are not especially strong. The following identified groups do not include all the species in the genus.

Subgenera Artemisia and Absinthium

Subgenera Artemisia and Absinthium are sometimes, but not always, considered the same. Subgenus Artemisia (originally Abrotanum Besser) is characterized by a heterogamous flower head with female outer florets and hermaphrodite central florets, and a fertile, glabrous receptacle. Absinthium DC, though sometimes merged with subgenus Artemisia is characterized by heterogamous flower head with female outer florets and hermaphrodite central florets, and a fertile, hairy receptacle. Generally, previously proposed monotypic and non-monophyletic subgenera have been merged with the subgenus Artemesia due to molecular evidence. For example, in 2011 using ribosomal DNA analysis of their own and a review of molecular data (such as ITS sequence analysis) of others, S. Garcia and colleagues argued that it was logical to rename several Sphaeromeria and Picrothamnus (formerly designated sister genera to Artemisia) species as Artemisia, as well as to revert some Sphaeromeria species back to Artemisia, where they had been categorized previously. Part of this was due to research by Watson and colleagues, who found that the four subgenera were not monophyletic except for Dracunculus, after analyzing and matching the internal transcribed spacers of nuclear ribosomal DNA from many Seriphidium and Artemisia species, and the related genera Arctanthemum and Dendranthema. The authors concluded that inflorescence morphology is not alone reliable for categorizing the genus or some subgenera, as qualities that previously demarcated them (such as homogamous, discoid, ray-less inflorescences) seemed to have undergone paralleled evolution up to seven times.  Picrothamnus Nutt. (“bud sage”), now considered Artemisia spinescens and Sphaeromeria Nutt. (“chicken sage”) are some examples, both endemic to North America.

Tridentatae 
Section Tridentatae consists of eleven to thirteen species of coarse shrubs often known colloquially as "sagebrushes", which are very prominent parts of the flora in western North America. In some classifications, they have previously been considered part of the genus or subgenus Seriphidium, although recent studies have contested this lineage to Old World species. Tridentatae was first articulated as a section by Rydberg in 1916, and it was not until McArthur et al. in 1981 that Tridentatae was elevated to a separate subgenus from Seriphidium. The principal motive for their separation was geographical distribution, chemical makeup, and karyotype. Much of the debate surrounding Tridentatae is phytogeographic, thus habitat and geography are frequently cited when understanding the evolution of this endemic North American subgenus. Evolutionary cycles of wet and dry climates encouraged “diploid and polyploid races which are morphologically similar if not indistinguishable” (McArthur 598).

Autopolyploidy among plants is not uncommon, however Tridentatae exhibits a remarkable amount of chromosomal differences at the population level, rather than the taxon level. This contributes to the difficulty in determining Tridentatae's phylogeny. The subgenus’ relative homogeneity within ploidies has enabled it to habitually hybridize and backcross, resulting in a high degree of genetic variation at the population level rather than the taxon level. For instance, some articles suggest that to be monophyletic, section Tridentatae should exclude Artemisia bigelovii and Artemisia palmeri. and include Artemisia pygmaea and Artemisia rigida. These results were supported by extensive chloroplast DNA (cpDNA) and nrDNA sequencing which departed from prior morphological, anatomical, and behavioral data.

Traditional lineages within Tridentatae were proposed on the basis of leaf morphology, habitat preference, and the ability to leaf-sprout, among other morphological and behavioral characteristics. For instance, sagebrush in the Artemisia tridentata lineage have tridentate leaves, live in especially arid habitats, and are unable to root-sprout. This method of delimitation is problematic for species that do not fully adhere to the characteristics of a given lineage. The dry habitat and the presence of interxylary cork has often made the case for Tridentatae as a subgenus of its own, and there is some ribosomal molecular evidence of a “Tridentatae core” group for the subgenus. In 2011, Garcia and colleagues proposed enlarging Tridentatae and organized it into the sections Tridentatae, Nebulosae, and Filifoliae based on previous research establishing relationships via ribosomal and nuclear DNA.

Intergrading forms are particularly common in recently radiated subgenera such as Tridentatae, given their frequent reversals and convergent evolution. Global reviews of Artemisia using ITS analysis support the hypothesis that Tridentatae has independent origins from Old World Seriphidium These findings were compared with capitula morphology, challenging past assumptions based on floral characteristics. To better understand the rapid diversification and radiation relative to Old World Artemisia, a closer study of Beriginian or Arctic species may provide missing links.

 Artemisia tridentata
 Artemisia cana
 Artemisia nova
 Artemisia rigida
 Artemisia arbuscula
 Artemisia longiloba
 Artemisia tripartita
 Artemisia pygmaea
 Artemisia rothrockii

Section Tridentatae includes above species with exception of Artemisia longiloba, which is treated as a subspecies of Artemisia arbuscula. Section Nebulae includes Artemisia californica, Artemisia nesiotica, and Artemisia filifolia.

Seriphidium 
The Old World species which different classifications put into the genus or subgenus Seriphidium consist of about 125 species native to Europe and temperate Asia, with the largest number of species in Central Asia. Some classifications, such as that of the Flora of North America, exclude any New World plants from Seriphidium. They are herbaceous plants or small shrubs.

Seriphidium Besser was morphologically categorized by a homogamous flower head with all hermaphrodite florets and fertile and glabrous receptacle. Tridentatae was originally categorized as within Seriphidium due to floral, inflorescence, and leaf morphological similarities, until McArthur et al.’s analysis in 1981, which explained these similarities as convergent evolution. Old World Seriphidium, with 125 species native to Europe and temperate Asia, was a previous classification of Seriphidium. North American or "New World" Seriphidium and Old World Seriphidium. North American Seriphidium were later placed into Tridentatae Rydb due to geographical distribution, growth habit, and karyotypic and chemotaxonomic similarities (such as presence of certain terpenols).

Subgenus Dracunculus 
One group which is well-supported by molecular data is subgenus Dracunculus. It consists of 80 species found in both North America and Eurasia, of which the best-known is perhaps Artemisia dracunculus, the spice tarragon.

Dracunculus Besser. has historically been characterized morphologically by a heterogamous flower head with female outer florets and hermaphrodite central florets, but with a female-sterile, glabrous receptacle. Dracunculus is the most supported and resolved subgenus of Artemisia, which includes Artemisia dracunculus L., known as the cooking spice tarragon. Chloroplast and ribosomal DNA sequence analysis in 2011 supported monophyly with two clades, one of which includes some North American endemic species as well as most species of Europe and Asia, while the second clade includes just A. salsoloides and A. Tanaitica, found in Eastern Europe and Siberia to the Western Himalayas. This study places Dracunculus as one of the more recent subgenera within Artemisia, situating A. Salisoides more basally on the tree, with North American endemic groups such as the sagebrushes having derived on the other end of a split from a common ancestor with Dracunculus. Formerly proposed genera Mausolea, Neopallasia and Turaniphytum are now argued to be within the subgenus Dracunculus due to ribosomal and chloroplast DNA evidence, with further species resolved as sister groups to Dracunculus due to phytochemical relationships.

Cultivation and uses 
The aromatic leaves of some species are used for flavouring. Most species have an extremely bitter taste. A. dracunculus (tarragon) is widely used as a culinary herb, particularly important in French cuisine.

Artemisia vulgaris (mugwort) was used to repel midges (mug > midge), fleas and moths, intestinal worms, and in brewing (mugwort beer, mugwort wine) as a remedy against hangovers and nightmares.

Artemisia absinthium is used to make the highly potent spirits absinthe. Malört also contains wormwood.  The aperitif vermouth (derived from the German word Wermut, "wormwood") is a wine flavored with aromatic herbs, but originally with wormwood.

Artemisia arborescens (tree wormwood, or sheeba in Arabic) is an aromatic herb indigenous to the Middle East used in tea, usually with mint.

A few species are grown as ornamental plants, the fine-textured ones used for clipped bordering. All grow best in free-draining sandy soil, unfertilized, and in full sun.

Artemisia stelleriana is known as Dusty Miller, but several other species bear that name, including Jacobaea maritima (syn. Senecio cineraria), Silene coronaria (syn. Lychnis coronaria), and Centaurea cineraria.

The largest collection of living Artemisia species, subspecies and cultivars is held in the National Collection of Artemisia in Sidmouth, Devon, UK , which holds about 400 taxa. The National Collection scheme is administered by Plant Heritage (formerly National Council for Conservation of Plants and Gardens, NCCPG) in the British Isles.

Medicinal
Artemisinin (from Artemisia annua) and derivatives are a group of compounds used to treat malaria. Treatments containing an artemisinin derivative (artemisinin-combination therapies) are now standard treatment worldwide for malaria caused by Plasmodium falciparum. Administering Artemisia annua as dried whole leaves may cause resistance to develop more slowly than if it is administered as pure artemisenin. 

The World Health Organization does not support the promotion or use of Artemisia plant material in any form for the prevention or treatment of malaria. They note that the plant form of medication has several problems. These include a lack of consistent Artemisia content, the content being low enough that recurrence of malaria often occurs, that the use of the plant may contribute to widespread artemisinin resistance, and that the plant form is not effective in malaria prevention.

As of June 2020, there is no evidence that Artemisia can treat or prevent COVID-19.

Culture 
Artemisia has been mentioned and used in popular culture for centuries. A few examples are:
 Artemisia herba-alba is thought to be the plant translated as "wormwood" in English language versions of the Bible (apsinthos in the Greek text). Wormwood is mentioned seven times in the Jewish Bible, always with the implication of bitterness. It is mentioned once in the New Testament. Further references in the Bible show wormwood was a common herb known for its bitter taste.
 In Shakespeare's play Hamlet, the titular character says "Wormwood, wormwood" to comment on the bitter implications of what the Player Queen has just said.

Ecology 
Artemisia species are found on every continent except Antarctica, and have become part of many ecosystems around the world as a result. Below is currently a partial view of the importance of Artemisia species in ecosystems around the world.

North American ecology of Artemisia

In North America, several species of Artemisia have become important parts of local environments, with wide adaptability. Artemisia papposa described by S.F.Blake & Arthur Cronquist can grow in the harsh, dry expanses of alkali flats, but also adapts to meadowlands.

Sagebrushes like A. papposa (of the Tridenteae subgenus) in general are found in the north and southwest areas of the North American continent. In the Intermountain West, in a habitat known as Sagebrush Steppe, A. tridentata, A. tripartite, and A. arbuscula grow alongside various grasses and species of bitter bush, creating an important environment for mule deer, pygmy rabbits, antelopes, and the sage grouse. Understanding the phylogenetic relationships among the sagebrushes has been helpful in understanding the relationships among these plants and their environments, as well as learning more about how these plants formed these communities over long stretches of time. Sagebrushes, which include A. ludoviciana and A. Tridentata among others, can often also be found growing near junipers, particularly in the Elkhorn Mountain region, where the Juniper Woodlands form an ecosystem which provide cover for many animal species in both summer and winter months and storms. Because the habitat should burn only every 400–600 years, with sagebrush shrubs living as long as 200 years (though potentially typically 88), this particular combination of Artemisia with other flora form an enduring habitat. As it often goes, however, governments and farming businesses have often cleared sagebrush-juniper communities to create land for cow and domestic animal feedcrops, and Artemisia species may be declining due to this and invasive species such as cheatgrass. Destabilization of the vegetation creates higher risk of fires, causing concern among the local conservation and wildlife groups.

Due to their often extensive rhizome systems and other potential characteristics, however, some Artemisia species are often resilient to mowing or pulling, giving some species of Artemisia the ability to easily become invasive if introduced to comfortable, though non-native habitats.
 A. annua (native to Eurasia) is found in wetland habitats, and though it has been naturalized in much of North America it is considered weedy or invasive by some localities, such as Kentucky.
 This is particularly true of Artemisia vulgaris, known as “common mugwort,” in North America, where it was introduced by European colonists and settlers in the 1600s, when Jesuit priests and other colonizers may have first brought the herb for ointments and teas and likely also let into port cities via ballast dumping. Artemisia vulgaris will grow in dense groups and out-compete other plants in an area, in part due to its ability to grow on poorly enriched soils. Disturbed habitats, cities and roadsides or parking lots can easily become a field of A. vulgaris, which is the Artemisia species designated as invasive by New York State.

References

Further reading

External links 

 Flora Europaea: Artemisia
 Chinese Plant Names: Artemisia species list and Seriphidium species list
 Flora of Pakistan: Artemisia and Seriphidium species list

 
Medicinal plants
Asteraceae genera